Croatian is the standardized variety of the Serbo-Croatian pluricentric language used by Croats, principally in Croatia, Bosnia and Herzegovina, the Serbian province of Vojvodina, and other neighboring countries. It is the official and literary standard of Croatia and one of the official languages of the European Union. Croatian is also one of the official languages of Bosnia and Herzegovina and a recognized minority language in Serbia and neighboring countries.

Standard Croatian is based on the most widespread dialect of Serbo-Croatian, Shtokavian, more specifically on Dubrovnik subdialect of Eastern Herzegovinian dialect, which the latter is also the basis of Standard Serbian, Bosnian, and Montenegrin. In the mid-18th century, the first attempts to provide a Croatian literary standard began on the basis of the Neo-Shtokavian dialect that served as a supraregional lingua franca pushing back regional Chakavian, Kajkavian, and Shtokavian vernaculars. The decisive role was played by Croatian Vukovians, who cemented the usage of Ijekavian Neo-Shtokavian as the literary standard in the late 19th and the beginning of the 20th century, in addition to designing a phonological orthography. Croatian is written in Gaj's Latin alphabet.

Besides the Shtokavian dialect, on which Standard Croatian is based, there are two other main dialects spoken on the territory of Croatia, Chakavian and Kajkavian. These dialects, and the four national standards, are usually subsumed under the term "Serbo-Croatian" in English, though this term is controversial for native speakers, and paraphrases such as "Bosnian-Croatian-Montenegrin-Serbian" (BCMS), are therefore sometimes used instead, especially in diplomatic circles.

History

Modern language and standardization
In the late medieval period up to the 17th century, the majority of semi-autonomous Croatia was ruled by two domestic dynasties of princes (banovi), the Zrinski and the Frankopan, which were linked by inter-marriage. Toward the 17th century, both of them attempted to unify Croatia both culturally and linguistically, writing in a mixture of all three principal dialects (Chakavian, Kajkavian and Shtokavian), and calling it "Croatian", "Dalmatian", or "Slavonian". Historically, several other names were used as synonyms for Croatian, in addition to Dalmatian and Slavonian, and these were Illyrian (ilirski) and Slavic (slovinski). It is still used now in parts of Istria, which became a crossroads of various mixtures of Chakavian with Ekavian, Ijekavian and Ikavian isoglosses.

The most standardized form (Kajkavian–Ikavian) became the cultivated language of administration and intellectuals from the Istrian peninsula along the Croatian coast, across central Croatia up into the northern valleys of the Drava and the Mura. The cultural apex of this 17th century idiom is represented by the editions of "Adrianskoga mora sirena" ("The Siren of the Adriatic Sea") by Petar Zrinski and "Putni tovaruš" ("Traveling escort") by Katarina Zrinska.

However, this first linguistic renaissance in Croatia was halted by the political execution of Petar Zrinski and Fran Krsto Frankopan by the Holy Roman Emperor Leopold I in Vienna in 1671. Subsequently, the Croatian elite in the 18th century gradually abandoned this combined Croatian standard.

Illyrian period

The Illyrian movement was a 19th-century pan-South Slavic political and cultural movement in Croatia that had the goal to standardize the regionally differentiated and orthographically inconsistent literary languages in Croatia, and finally merge them into a common South Slavic literary language. Specifically, three major groups of dialects were spoken on Croatian territory, and there had been several literary languages over four centuries. The leader of the Illyrian movement Ljudevit Gaj standardized the Latin alphabet in 1830–1850 and worked to bring about a standardized orthography. Although based in Kajkavian-speaking Zagreb, Gaj supported using the more populous Neo-Shtokavian – a version of Shtokavian that eventually became the predominant dialectal basis of both Croatian and Serbian literary language from the 19th century on. Supported by various South Slavic proponents, Neo-Shtokavian was adopted after an Austrian initiative at the Vienna Literary Agreement of 1850, laying the foundation for the unified Serbo-Croatian literary language. The uniform Neo-Shtokavian then became common in the Croatian elite.

In the 1860s, the Zagreb Philological School dominated the Croatian cultural life, drawing upon linguistic and ideological conceptions advocated by the members of the Illyrian movement. While it was dominant over the rival Rijeka Philological School and Zadar Philological Schools, its influence waned with the rise of the Croatian Vukovians (at the end of the 19th century).

Distinguishing features and differences between standards

Croatian is commonly characterized by the Ijekavian pronunciation (see an explanation of yat reflexes), the sole use of the Latin alphabet, and a number of lexical differences in common words that set it apart from standard Serbian, notably through the deliberate inclusion of some old Serbo-Croatian words from the 19th century. Some differences are absolute, while some appear mainly in the frequency of use. However, "an examination of all the major 'levels' of language shows that BCS is clearly a single language with a single grammatical system."

Sociopolitical standpoints
Croatian, although technically a form of Serbo-Croatian, is sometimes considered a distinct language by itself. This is at odds with purely linguistic classifications of languages based on mutual intelligibility (abstand and ausbau languages), which do not allow varieties that are mutually intelligible to be considered separate languages. "There is no doubt of the near 100% mutual intelligibility of (standard) Croatian and (standard) Serbian, as is obvious from the ability of all groups to enjoy each others’ films, TV and sports broadcasts, newspapers, rock lyrics etc." Differences between various standard forms of Serbo-Croatian are often exaggerated for political reasons. Most Croatian linguists regard Croatian as a separate language that is considered key to national identity. The issue is sensitive in Croatia as the notion of a separate language being the most important characteristic of a nation is widely accepted, stemming from the 19th-century history of Europe. The 1967 Declaration on the Status and Name of the Croatian Literary Language, in which a group of Croatian authors and linguists demanded greater autonomy for Croatian, is viewed in Croatia as a linguistic policy milestone that was also a general milestone in national politics. At the 50th anniversary of the Declaration, at the beginning of 2017, a two-day meeting of experts from Croatia, Bosnia-Herzegovina, Serbia and Montenegro was organized in Zagreb, at which the text of the Declaration on the Common Language of Croats, Bosniaks, Serbs and Montenegrins was drafted. The new Declaration has received more than ten thousand signatures. It states that in Croatia, Serbia, Bosnia-Herzegovina and Montenegro a common polycentric standard language is used, consisting of several standard varieties, similar to the existing varieties of German, English or Spanish. The aim of the new Declaration is to stimulate discussion on language without the nationalistic baggage and to counter nationalistic divisions.

The terms "Serbo-Croatian" or "Serbo-Croat" are still used as a cover term for all these forms by foreign scholars, even though the speakers themselves largely do not use it. Within ex-Yugoslavia, the term has largely been replaced by the ethnic terms Serbian, Croatian, and Bosnian.

The use of the name "Croatian" for a language names has been historically attested to, though not always distinctively; the Croatian–Hungarian Agreement, for example, designated "Croatian" as one of its official languages, and Croatian became an official EU language upon accession of Croatia to the EU on 1 July 2013. In 2013, the EU started publishing a Croatian-language version of its official gazette.

Official status

Standard Croatian is the official language of the Republic of Croatia and, along with Standard Bosnian and Standard Serbian, one of three official languages of Bosnia and Herzegovina. It is also official in the regions of Burgenland (Austria), Molise (Italy) and Vojvodina (Serbia). Additionally, it has co-official status alongside Romanian in the communes of Carașova and Lupac, Romania. In these localities, Croats or Krashovani make up the majority of the population, and education, signage and access to public administration and the justice system are provided in Croatian, alongside Romanian.

Croatian is officially used and taught at all the universities in Croatia, and at the University of Mostar in Bosnia and Herzegovina.

There is no regulatory body that determines the proper usage of Croatian. The current standard language is generally laid out in the grammar books and dictionaries used in education, such as the school curriculum prescribed by the Ministry of Education and the university programmes of the Faculty of Philosophy at the four main universities. In 2013, a Hrvatski pravopis by the Institute of Croatian Language and Linguistics received an official sole seal of approval from the Ministry of Education.

The most prominent recent editions describing the Croatian standard language are:

 Hrvatski pravopis by the Institute of Croatian Language and Linguistics, available online
 Hrvatski jezični portal by University Computing Centre (Srce) and Znanje, available online.
 Rječnik hrvatskoga jezika by Anić
 Rječnik hrvatskoga jezika by Šonje et al.
 Hrvatski enciklopedijski rječnik, by a group of authors
 Hrvatska gramatika by Barić et al.

Also notable are the recommendations of Matica hrvatska, the national publisher and promoter of Croatian heritage, and the Lexicographical institute Miroslav Krleža, as well as the Croatian Academy of Sciences and Arts.

Numerous representative Croatian linguistic works were published since the independence of Croatia, among them three voluminous monolingual dictionaries of contemporary Croatian.

The Institute of Croatian Language and Linguistics added the Bunjevac dialect to the List of Protected Intangible Cultural Heritage of the Republic of Croatia on 8 October 2021. The Bunjevac dialect branches (Dalmatian, Danubian, and Littoral-Lika) are categorised by Croatia as New-Shtokavian Ikavian dialects of the Shtokavian dialect of the Croatian language. Its speakers largely use the Latin alphabet and are living in parts of Bosnia and Herzegovina, different parts of Croatia, southern parts (inc. Budapest) of Hungary as well in the autonomous province Vojvodina of Serbia.

Sample text 
Article 1 of the Universal Declaration of Human Rights in Croatian:
Sva ljudska bića rađaju se slobodna i jednaka u dostojanstvu i pravima. Ona su obdarena razumom i sviješću i treba da jedno prema drugome postupaju u duhu bratstva.

Article 1 of the Universal Declaration of Human Rights in English:
All human beings are born free and equal in dignity and rights. They are endowed with reason and conscience and should act towards one another in a spirit of brotherhood.

See also

Bunjevac dialect 
Croatian Language Corpus
Croatian Language Days
Declaration on the Common Language 2017
Dialects of Serbo-Croatian
Gaj's Latin alphabet
Language secessionism in Serbo-Croatian
Mutual intelligibility
Pluricentric Serbo-Croatian language

References

Sources

Further reading
 
 Banac, Ivo: Main Trends in the Croatian Language Question, YUP 1984
  (CROLIB).
 Franolić, Branko: A Historical Survey of Literary Croatian, Nouvelles Editions Latines, 1984
 
 
 
  (reprinted in 2008 as )
  (Inhaltsverzeichnis).
 Kačić, Miro: Croatian and Serbian: Delusions and Distortions, Novi Most, Zagreb 1997
 
 Moguš, Milan: A History of the Croatian Language, NZ Globus, 1995
 Težak, Stjepko: "Hrvatski naš (ne)zaboravljeni" [Croatian, our (un)forgotten language], 301 p., knjižnica Hrvatski naš svagdašnji (knj. 1), Tipex, Zagreb, 1999,  (Croatian)
  (NSK). (FFZG).

External links

Croatian Swadesh list of basic vocabulary words (Wiktionary)
Croatian Language Corpus
Croatian Old Dictionary Portal
Most similar languages to Croatian (similarity measure)

Language history
The Croatian Language Today, a lecture given by dr. Branko Franolić
History of Croatian Dictionaries and Grammar books at Yale University Library – Slavic and East European Collection

 
Languages of Croatia
Languages of Bosnia and Herzegovina
Languages of Serbia
Languages of Vojvodina
Languages of Austria
Languages of Hungary
Languages of Molise
Languages of Italy
Languages of Slovenia
Slavic languages written in Latin script